Jesuit School of Theology may refer to Jesuit theology in general, or to a specific theological college or faculty run by the order, including:

 Weston Jesuit School of Theology, Boston College, USA
 Jesuit School of Theology of Santa Clara University